Ryan Ashley Robertson (born October 2, 1976) is an American former professional basketball player who was selected by the Sacramento Kings in the 2nd round (45th pick) of the 1999 NBA Draft. He played college basketball at the University of Kansas under coach Roy Williams. He scored a career high 31 points in a second round loss to Kentucky in the 1999 NCAA Tournament.

Robertson also played varsity basketball for four years at St. Charles West High School from 1991 to 1995. During his tenure at St. Charles West the basketball team made it to the final four in the Missouri State Championship for the first time. Robertson led the team to the State championship in 1995.

He started his professional career with the Kansas Cagerz
He played one game for the Sacramento Kings during the 1999-2000 NBA season, scoring five points.  He later played professionally for the American Basketball Association team Kansas City Knights during the 2000–2001 season.  After one season with the Kansas City minor league team, he then moved to Europe to play in the Netherlands for EiffelTowers Nijmegen during the 2001–04 seasons. With EiffelTowers, he won the Dutch championship and Cup in 2003.

He finished his professional career playing for Panellinios B.C. (Greece) and Cholet Basket (France) during the 2004–05 season.

References

External links
NBA statistics at Basketball Reference

1976 births
Living people
American expatriate basketball people in Greece
American expatriate basketball people in France
American expatriate basketball people in the Netherlands
American men's basketball players
Basketball players from Oklahoma
Cholet Basket players
Heroes Den Bosch players
Greek Basket League players
Kansas Jayhawks men's basketball players
McDonald's High School All-Americans
Panellinios B.C. players
Sacramento Kings draft picks
Sacramento Kings players
Shooting guards
Sportspeople from Lawton, Oklahoma